After Dark is the fourth album by guitarist/singer/songwriter Ray Parker Jr. released on August 25, 1987 by Geffen Records. The album rose to No. 27 on the Billboard Top Soul Albums chart.

Overview and singles
After Dark was produced by Ray Parker Jr., Burt Bacharach and Carole Bayer Sager. As a single "I Don't Think That Man Should Sleep Alone" rose to No. 5 on the Billboard Hot Soul Songs chart. A duet with Natalie Cole called Over You also rose to No. 10 on the Billboard Hot Soul Songs chart.

Track listing

Personnel

Musicians 
 Ray Parker Jr. – all instruments, arrangements (1, 3, 4, 6-10)
 Burt Bacharach – keyboards, arrangements (2)
 Robbie Buchanan – keyboards 
 Eric Daniels – keyboards 
 Wayne Linsey – keyboards 
 Greg Phillinganes – keyboards
 Sylvester Rivers – keyboards
 Larry Williams – synthesizers
 Kevin Toney – acoustic piano
 Paul Jackson Jr. – guitars
 Nathan East – bass guitar 
 Cornelius Mims – bass guitar 
 Neil Stubenhaus – bass guitar
 Ollie E. Brown – drums 
 Jeff Porcaro – drums 
 Carlos Vega – drums
 Gerald Albright – saxophone solo (2)
 David Boroff – saxophone solo (4)
 Gene Page – arrangements (5)
 Natalie Cole – lead vocals (2)

Background vocalists 
 Philip Bailey, Arnell Carmichael, Lynne Fiddmont, Candice Ghant, Keith Harrison, Yogi Horton, Kamaya Koepke, Kashif (also BGV arrangements on 5), Cornelius Mims, Ray Parker Jr., Greg Phillinganes, Monty Seaward, Anita Sherman, Julia Waters, Maxine Waters and Karyn White

Production 
 Producers – Ray Parker Jr. (tracks 1, 3–6, 8, 9 & 10); Burt Bacharach (tracks 4 & 7); Carole Bayer Sager (tracks 4 & 7)
 Production assistant – Horatio Gordon
 Engineer – Steve Halquist
 Additional engineers – Mick Guzauski, Mike Mancini, Gary Olazabal and Tommy Vicari
 Assistant engineers – Jerry Hall and Ray Parker III
 Art direction – Laura LiPuma
 Photography – Victoria Sim

References

External links
 After Dark at Discogs

1987 albums
Geffen Records albums
Ray Parker Jr. albums
Albums produced by Ray Parker Jr.
Albums produced by Burt Bacharach